Coringa  may refer to:

Australia
 Coringa, Queensland, a locality in the North Burnett Region

 Coringa-Herald National Nature Reserve, Coral Sea Islands Territory

India
 Coringa, East Godavari district, a village in Andhra Pradesh
 Coringa Wildlife Sanctuary, Andhra Pradesh
 Alternative spelling of Koringa River, near the Yanam

Brazil 

 Portuguese for the DC Comic's villain The Joker.